Barack the Barbarian is a comic book series published by Devil's Due Publishing beginning in June 2009. It was written by Larry Hama, with art by Christopher Schons.

Barack the Barbarian originally appeared in a four-issue mini-series. The story features the 44th President of the United States, Barack Obama as a Conan the Barbarian-style figure. It also features other politicians like Sarah Palin, George W. Bush, and Dick Cheney in fictional roles.

The series was followed by a one-shot, The Fall of Red Sarah.

Publication history
In November 2008, one of Obama's advisers gave an interview to journalist Jon Swaine of The Daily Telegraph titled, "Barack Obama: The 50 facts you might not know". In the interview, it emerged that Obama collects Conan the Barbarian.

The idea for the series originated with Devil's Due publisher Josh Blaylock who explained that "We didn't want to be completely slapsticky. It is definitely partly a gimmick, but we wanted to do something clever with [the Obama comics trend]." He contacted Larry Hama with his idea for a series called Obama the Barbarian, and Hama described how the idea developed during the course of the phonecall:

The writer has said it is more than just a political satire: "I just think of it as sword and sorcery, only the characters look really familiar."

Collected editions
The comic books are being collected into a trade paperback:

Barack the Barbarian Volume 1: Quest for the Treasure of Stimuli (144 pages, December 2009)

See also
Barack Obama in comics

Notes

References

External links
Barack the Barbarian webcomic at Devil's Due
Review: Barack The Barbarian #1 By Larry Hama And Tim Seeley for Devil’s Due by Rich Johnston, Bleeding Cool, June 23, 2009
Barack the Barbarian #1, Newsarama Blog, July 4, 2009

2009 comics debuts
Comics about politics
Cultural depictions of Barack Obama
American political satire
Parody comics
Parodies of literature
Parodies of films
Fantasy comics
Satirical comics
Cultural depictions of Sarah Palin
Comics based on real people
African-American comics
Sword and sorcery
Black people in comics